The 373d Strategic Missile Squadron is an inactive United States Air Force unit that was first established during World War II. After a series of inactivations and reactivations, the squadron was last assigned to the 308th Strategic Missile Wing, stationed at Little Rock Air Force Base, Arkansas.

The 373rd was equipped with the LGM-25C Titan II Intercontinental ballistic missile in 1962, with a mission of nuclear deterrence. The squadron was inactivated for the last time as part of the phaseout of the Titan II ICBM on 18 August 1987, as ordered by President Ronald Reagan.

History

World War II
The 373rd Strategic Missile Squadron was first activated on 15 April 1942 at Gowen Field, Idaho as a long-range Consolidated B-24 Liberator bombardment squadron under the Second Air Force. For the next three months, little training occurred while the unit worked through its growing pains, resolving administrative and personnel acquisition difficulties. Then, a new problem arose: all but four personnel were transferred to the 330th Bombardment Group!  While active on paper, it was not until September that personnel were taken from the 39th Bombardment Group to form a headquarters cadre for the 308th Bombardment Group, again making it a viable unit. On 29 September the squadron was designated an Operational Training Unit with Wendover Field, Utah as its home station. The unit was fully manned by November, after receiving personnel from the 18th Replacement Wing.

During this time of trials and tribulations in forming a recognizable force, the flying echelon had transferred to Davis–Monthan Field, Arizona, on 20 June for incidental training. The flight crews had been chosen and assigned, having completed their respective training schools; i.e., pilot, navigator, bombardier, engineer, radio and gunnery.

Members of the squadron had to complete three phases of training prior to moving overseas and entering combat. The flying personnel spent most of October in transition, training with the B-24, as well as training combat crews. Meanwhile, the ground echelon was acquiring, organizing and processing personnel and supplies at Wendover Field.

With the training complete and the personnel and supplies processed, the 308th Group and the 373rd Squadron transferred to Fourteenth Air Force in China early in 1943. The air echelon began flying its brand new B-24D Liberators from Morrison Field, Florida on 15 February 1943. Traveling by way of the South Atlantic Transport Route through Central and South America, the Azores, Central Africa, Arabia and finally India; while the ground echelon traveled by ship across the Pacific Ocean.

The squadron arrived in India and made many trips over the Hump between India and China to obtain gasoline, bombs, spare parts, and other items they needed to prepare for and sustain their combat operations.   The 375th supported Chinese ground forces; attacked airfields, coal yards, docks, oil refineries and fuel dumps in French Indochina; mined rivers and ports; bombed maintenance shops and docks at Rangoon, Burma; attacked Japanese shipping in the East China Sea, Formosa Straits, South China Sea and Gulf of Tonkin.

On 15 September 1943, seven B-24s of the 373d Bombardment Squadron, 308th Bombardment Group, based at Yangkai Airfield were dispatched to attack a Vichy French cement plant in Haiphong, a major port on the Gulf of Tonkin, that had just been turned over to the Japanese though not without resistance from Governor-General of French Indochina, Jean Decoux. Two B-24s, however, broke down while attempting to take off from Yangkai Airfield so the five remaining planes continued the mission. When the five B-24s reached Haiphong, they were attacked by Japanese fighters. One plane went down, forcing the other planes to abandon the mission as they were continuously attacked. Two more planes went down and forced the aircrews to bail out. The Japanese pilots then went after one of the B-24 plane's parachutists and fired at them while they were descending to the ground, killing three and wounding three others. The other two B-24 planes escaped severe damage and returned to Yangkai Airfield (one plane, however, crashed at the airfield, killing the entire crew).

The squadron moved to Okinawa in June 1945, where it was assigned to the 494th Bombardment Group. From its base at Yontan Airfield it engaged primarily in attacks against enemy airfields on Kyūshū and around the Inland Sea of Japan until V-J Day. It also struck airfields in China and Korea.  The unit also participated in incendiary raids and dropped propaganda leaflets over urban areas of Kyūshū.  After the war's end, the unit transporting personnel and supplies from Manila to Tokyo.  In December, the 373d returned to the United States, where it was inactivated at the Vancouver Barracks Port of Embarkation on 6 January 1946.

Strategic Air Command
The squadron was reactivated in Alaska in 1947 as a Strategic Air Command (SAC) weather reconnaissance squadron. Gathering weather information for combat readiness was an integrated part of strategic aerial reconnaissance. While there was a constant need for weather information, weather flights were also a convenient cover for more covert missions with the Boeing RB-29 Superfortress photographic reconnaissance aircraft over the eastern frontier of the Soviet Union. The squadron was later inactivated in February 1951.

In October 1951, the 373rd Bombardment Squadron was reactivated again with new Boeing B-47E Stratojet swept-wing medium bombers, capable of flying at high subsonic speeds and primarily designed for penetrating the airspace of the Soviet Union. In the early late 1950s, the B-47 was considered to be reaching obsolescence, and began phasing out of SAC's strategic arsenal. B-47s were sent to the Aerospace Maintenance and Regeneration Center at Davis–Monthan in July 1959 and the squadron became non-operational. It was inactivated once more on 25 June 1961.

Intercontinental ballistic missile squadron
In 1962, the squadron was reactivated and re-designated as a SAC LGM-25C Titan II intercontinental ballistic missile strategic missile squadron.  It operated nine Titan II underground silos whose construction began in 1960; the first site (373-5) was operationally ready on 15 June 1963. The 9 missile silos controlled by the 373d Strategic Missile Squadron remained on alert for over 20 years during the Cold War. On 8 August 1965, at launch site 373-4, 53 contractor workers died in a flash fire while installing modifications to the launch silo. The cause of the accident was believed to be a rupture in a high-pressure line, which spewed hydraulic fluid on the floor. Ignited by sparks from a nearby welder, the resulting fire consumed most of the oxygen in the space, suffocating the workers.

The squadron operated nine missile sites:

 373-1 (15 Nov 1963 – 5 January 1987), 1.2 mi S of Mount Vernon, AR    
 373-2 (29 Nov 1963 – 4 May 1987), 3.7 mi E of Rose Bud, AR        
 373-3 (19 Oct 1963 – 18 March 1987), 4.4 mi SE of Heber Springs, AR  
 373-4 (16 May 1963 – 18 February 1987)*, 2.1 mi ENE of Letona, AR        
 373-5 (15 Jun 1963 – 20 October 1986), 1.5 mi E of Center Hill, AR     
 373-6 (23 Nov 1963 – 20 June 1985), 4.9 mi WNW of McRae, AR         
 373-7 (26 Jun 1963 – 3 April 1986), 6.1 mi W of Russell, AR         
 373-8 (18 Dec 1963 – 20 October 1986), 2.5 mi NNW of Judsonia, AR      
 373-9 (28 Oct 1963 – 3 October 1985), 2.1 mi SSE of Holland, AR      

In October 1981, President Ronald Reagan announced that as part of the strategic modernization program, Titan II systems were to be retired by 1 October 1987. Inactivation of the sites began when site 373-6 was inactivated on 20 June 1985, with the last site (373–2) inactivated on 4 May 1987. The squadron was inactivated on 18 August.

After removal from service, the silos had reusable equipment removed by Air Force personnel, and contractors retrieved salvageable metals before destroying the silos with explosives and filling them in. Access to the vacated control centers was blocked off. Missile sites were later sold off to private ownership after demilitarization. Today, the remains of the sites are still visible in aerial imagery, in various states of use or abandonment.  Titan II ICBM Launch Complex 373-5 Site was listed on the National Register of Historic Places in 2000.

Lineage
 Constituted 373d Bombardment Squadron (Heavy) on 28 January 1942
 Activated on 15 April 1942
 Redesignated 373d Bombardment Squadron, Heavy c. 1944
 Inactivated on 7 January 1946.
 Redesignated: 373d Reconnaissance Squadron, Very Long Range, Weather on 16 September 1947.
 Activated on 15 October 1947
 Inactivated on 21 February 1951
 Redesignated 373d Bombardment Squadron, Medium on 4 October 1951
 Activated on 10 October 1951
 Discontinued and inactivated on 25 June 1961
 Redesignated 373d Strategic Missile Squadron (ICBM-Titan) and activated on 29 November 1961 (not organized)
 Organized on 1 April 1962
 Inactivated on 18 August 1987

Assignments
 308th Bombardment Group, 15 April 1942
 494th Bombardment Group, 21 July 1945
 11th Bombardment Group, 11 October 1945 – 7 January 1946
 8th Weather Group (later 2108th Air Weather Group), 15 October 1947 – 21 February 1951
 308th Bombardment Group, 10 October 1951 (attached to 21st Air Division until 17 April 1952)
 308th Bombardment Wing, 16 June 1952 – 25 June 1961
 Strategic Air Command, 29 November 1961 (not organized)
 308th Strategic Missile Wing, 1 April 1962 – 18 August 1987

Stations

 Gowen Field, Idaho, 15 April 1942
 Davis–Monthan Field, Arizona, 20 June 1942
 Alamogordo Army Air Field, New Mexico, 23 July 1942
 Davis–Monthan Field, Arizona, 28 August 1942
 Wendover Field, Utah, 1 October 1942
 Pueblo Army Air Base, Colorado, 30 November 1942 – 2 January 1943
 Yangkai Airfield, China, 20 March 1943
 Luliang Air Base, China, 14 September 1944

 Yontan Airfield, Okinawa, 21 July – 19 December 1945
 Vancouver Barracks, Washington, 4–7 January 1946
 Kindley Field, Bermuda, 15 October 1947 – 21 February 1951
 Forbes Air Force Base, Kansas, 10 October 1951
 Hunter Air Force Base, Georgia, 17 April 1952
 Plattsburgh Air Force Base, New York, 15 July 1959 – 25 June 1961
 Little Rock Air Force Base, Arkansas, 1 April 1962 – 18 August 1987

Aircraft and missiles
 Douglas B-18 Bolo, 1942
 Consolidated B-24 Liberator, 1942–1945
 Boeing TB-17 Flying Fortress, 1947–1948
 Boeing RB-29 Superfortress, 1947–1951
 Boeing B-29 Superfortress, 1947–1951, 1951–1953
 Boeing WB-29 Superfortress, 1947–1951
 Boeing B-47 Stratojet, 1954–1959
 LGM-25C Titan II, 1962–1987

See also

 List of United States Air Force missile squadrons

References
 Notes

Bibliography

 
 
 

Strategic missile squadrons of the United States Air Force
1942 establishments in Idaho
1987 disestablishments in Arkansas